Roger Kettlewell (born 1945) is a former Canadian football defensive back who played four seasons in the Canadian Football League with the BC Lions and Edmonton Eskimos. He played CIS football at Simon Fraser University. He also played junior football for the Vancouver Blue Bombers.

Professional career

BC Lions
Kettlewell played in 27 games for the BC Lions from 1966 to 1968.

Edmonton Eskimos
Kettlewell played in sixteen games for the Edmonton Eskimos during the 1969 season.

References

External links
Just Sports Stats

Living people
1945 births
Canadian football defensive backs
Simon Fraser Clan football players
BC Lions players
Edmonton Elks players